Phước Long is a commune-level town in Bạc Liêu Province in southern Vietnam. It is the county seat of Phước Long District.

References

Populated places in Bạc Liêu province
Communes of Bạc Liêu province
District capitals in Vietnam
Townships in Vietnam